Alexandre Poncet (born in 1884 in Saint-Chamond, Loire) was a French clergyman and bishop for the Roman Catholic Diocese of Wallis et Futuna. He was appointed bishop in 1935. He died in 1973.

After ordination as a priest Poncet served as a chaplain to the French community in London for 15 years, then as a seminary professor in Devon. He was appointed as a priest on Uvea in 1925 for three years, then served on Tongatapu and Niuafoʻou before being made Bishop of Wallis and Futuna in 1935.

References 

1884 births
1973 deaths
French Roman Catholic bishops
Roman Catholic bishops of Wallis et Futuna